The 2011 Donington Superbike World Championship round was the second round of the 2011 Superbike World Championship. It took place on the weekend of March 25–27, 2011 at Donington Park.

Results

Superbike race 1 classification

Superbike race 2 classification

Supersport race classification

Donington Superbike World Championship round
Donington